Stade Sabathé is a multi-use stadium in Montpellier, France.  It is currently used mostly for rugby union and rugby league matches and is the home stadium of Montpellier Red Devils. Until 2007 it was the home stadium of Montpellier RC. The stadium is able to hold 6,500 people.

References

Sabathe
Sabathe
Buildings and structures in Montpellier
Sports venues in Montpellier
Montpellier Hérault Rugby
Sports venues completed in 1930